Barrel is the fourth album by Lee Michaels and was released in 1970.  It reached #51 on the Billboard Top LPs chart.  Former Paul Revere & the Raiders' guitarist Drake Levin played guitar on the album.  The album featured a cover of Moby Grape's "Murder in My Heart (For the Judge)."

The album featured the single "What Now America" which did not chart on the Billboard single's chart.

Track listing
All songs written by Lee Michaels except where noted.
 "Mad Dog" (Michaels/Sheffield/Eddie Shuler) – 3:44
 "What Now America" – 3:25
 "Uummmm My Lady" – 3:00
 "Thumbs" – 4:05
 "When Johnny Comes Marching Home" (Louis Lambert) – 2:04
 "Murder in My Heart (For the Judge)" (Jerry Miller/Don Stevenson) – 3:36
 "Day of Change" – 3:32
 "Think I'll Cry" – 2:42
 "Games" (Bobby Womack) – 3:09
 "Didn't Know What I Had" – 3:12
 "As Long as I Can" – 1:27

Personnel

Musicians
 Lee Michaels – lead vocals, piano, Hammond organ
 Drake Levin-  guitar
 Barry "Frosty" Smith – drums

Technical
 Larry Marks – producer
 Tom Wilkes – art direction, photography
 Chuck Beeson – art direction
 Jim McCrary – photography

Charts

References

1970 albums
Lee Michaels albums
A&M Records albums